Passion's Promise, also published under the title Golden Moments, is a 1977 novel by American author Danielle Steel. It is Steel's second novel.

Synopsis
Kezia Saint Martin is a glamorous, jetsetting socialite with a secret identity as a crusading social justice journalist. She is increasingly torn between the two worlds and questions her own identity. These questions are brought to a head when she falls in love with a fellow crusader named Lucas John.

References

Chick lit novels
1977 American novels
Dell Publishing books
American romance novels
Contemporary romance novels